Vanessa Radman (born 1974) is a Croatian actress.

Biography 
Vanessa Radman was born in 1974 in Križevci. As a high school student she moved with her parents and sister Maša to the German city Wuppertal.

She is well known for her roles in Obični ljudi, Ponos Ratkajevih and Zora dubrovačka. Radman also had some appearances in German films and series. She is 5' 6½" (1,69 m) high. She speaks Croatian and German well.

She was married to Tim Panne, but they are divorced.

Filmography

Movie roles

Television roles

External links

1974 births
Living people
Croatian actresses
Croatian stage actresses
Croatian television actresses
Croatian film actresses
People from Križevci